They Know Their Groceries  is a 1929 Vitaphone Varieties short comedy film directed by Bryan Foy. It stars vaudeville comedy duo Flournoy Miller and Aubrey Lyles and features an African American cast. The plot involves inattentive grocers. Sam Sax was the producer.

Foy was himself a vaudevillian in a family of vaudevillians before he got into directing and producing films.

A review of the film described it as funny but not hilarious.

Cast
F. E. Miller
Aubrey Lyles
Vivienne Baber		
Onion Jeffrey
Paul Floyd
Oswald Lyles

References

1929 comedy films
1929 short films
American black-and-white films
American comedy short films
Films directed by Bryan Foy
Vitaphone short films
1920s English-language films
Silent comedy films